Bee Wash is an intermittent stream located in the U.S. state of California. It is located in Imperial County.

References

Rivers of Southern California
Rivers of Imperial County, California